The Faculty of Computer Science is a faculty of Dalhousie University in Halifax, Nova Scotia, Canada.

History

The Faculty of Computer Science was officially founded on 1 April 1997 with the merger of the Technical University of Nova Scotia (TUNS) into Dalhousie University.

The Faculty of Computer Science traces its history to the School of Computer Science at TUNS  and the Computer Science Division of the Department of Mathematics, Statistics and Computer Science at Dalhousie University.

Upon its founding, the Faculty of Computer Science took residence on the 15th and 16th floors of the Maritime Centre until the new Computer Science Building was completed in the fall of 1999. The new building was designed by Brian MacKay-Lyons and was featured in Canadian Architect in March 2000. It was renamed "Goldberg Computer Science Building" in June 2008 in recognition of a donation by Seymour Schulich and his wife, Tanna Goldberg-Schulich.

In July 2013, the Faculty launched the Institute for Big Data Analytics.

Programs
The Faculty of Computer Science offers several undergraduate programs including:

 Bachelor of Computer Science (with/without Honours) 
 Data science Specialization
 Artificial Intelligence Specialization
 Cyber Security Specialization
 Digital Media Specialization
 Bioinformatics Specialization
 Bachelor of Applied Computer Science (with/without Honours)

In general, the philosophy of the undergraduate program is to build a solid foundation of mathematics and computer science during the first three years of the program, allowing students more flexibility in fourth year.

The school offers a number of graduate level programs spanning fields such as bioinformatics, computational neuroscience, and machine learning.

Notable people
 Erik Demaine, Professor at MIT
 Danielle Fong, Co-founder of LightSail Energy
 Paul Gauthier, Co-founder of Inktomi and CTO of Groupon
 Peter O'Hearn

References

External links 
 Dalhousie Computer Science Website

Computer Science
Dalhousie